Luke Bowler Charman (born 9 December 1997) is an English professional footballer who plays as a striker for  club AFC Fylde. He began his career with Newcastle United, but never played for their first team, and made his professional debut in the EFL Trophy while on loan at Accrington Stanley. Released by Newcastle in 2020, he joined National League North club Darlington, for whom 19 goals from 33 appearances earned him a move to the Football League with Rochdale.

Life and career

Newcastle United
Charman was born in 1997 in Durham. He lived in nearby Sherburn Village and attended Belmont Community School. He joined Newcastle United's Academy at 15, made his debut for their under-18s in a 1–0 loss away to Arsenal U18 in April 2014, and took up a two-year scholarship in July after he left school. He was told in February 2016 that he would not be kept on at the end of the season, but the club had a change of heart and offered several scholars an extra year; coach Dave Watson picked him out as the player who had shown most improvement over the past year.

He continued to progress, and signed his first professional contract in 2017. During the 2017–18 season, he played twice for Newcastle U21 in the EFL Trophy, top scored for their under-23 team, and at the end of a season when 18 reserve players were released in a "major shake-up" when "all those who United do not consider to have a future at the club have been allowed to go", his contract was extended.

In August 2018, Charman joined League One club Accrington Stanley on loan for the season. Partly through injury, and partly because the rules limited the number of loanees in a matchday squad to fiveStanley had seven players on loanhe did not make his senior debut until 6 November, in the EFL Trophy in a 2–1 win against West Bromwich Albion U21s. Four days later, he started against Colchester United in the first round of the FA Cup, in which fellow Newcastle loanee Dan Barlaser scored the only goal. Shortly after coming on for his first league appearance, as a second-half substitute on 8 December at home to Sunderland in atrocious weather conditions, Charman was involved in the equaliser, which was Connor Hall's first league goal. Five minutes later, the referee abandoned the match, so neither Hall's goal nor Charman's appearance count towards their records. He was recalled by Newcastle in January 2019.

Charman captained Newcastle U23s at the start of the 2019–20 season, and scored a spectacular goal against Macclesfield Town in the EFL Trophy, but although he was hopeful of impressing manager Steve Bruce, he got no closer to the first team, and was released at the end of the season.

Darlington 
On 14 July 2020, Charman joined National League North side Darlington on a free transfer. He made his debut in the first match of the season, and scored both his side's goals in a 2–2 draw with Prescot Cables in the FA Cup, but had been substituted by the time Darlington won the tie on penalties. He made six appearances in the National League North without scoring, but contributed six goals from eight cup matches. In the last of those, he suffered a medial ligament injury that was expected to keep him out for several weeks, by which time the season had been abandoned because of issues surrounding the COVID-19 pandemic. Charman signed a new two-year contract in July 2021, his fitness improved, and he scored freely during the first half of the season, with 12 goals from 16 league appearances. Charman was keen to return to full-time football, and his club's refusal to accept an offer from a National League team had led to "tough conversations" with the player. Manager Alun Armstrong told him that "if he works his socks off and does well", there would be interest from clubs at Football League level, and "then we'll wish him all the best and he'll move on". In the expectation of his imminent departure, Darlington signed striker Tyrone O'Neill in early January 2022.

Rochdale
Amid interest from clubs including Bradford City and Hartlepool United, Charman signed a two-and-a-half-year contract with Rochdale of League Two on 20 January 2022; the fee was undisclosed. After completing a four-match suspension imposed for a second sending-off while at Darlington, Charman made his Rochdale and Football League debut on 1 February, replacing Alex Newby after 58 minutes of a 1–1 draw away to Colchester United. Charman finally scored for Rochdale on 30 April, with two goals in the first 17 minutes of the match at home to Bristol Rovers, but the match ended as a 4–3 defeat. After a brief substitute appearance in the opening match of the 2022–23 season, a hamstring injury was to keep him out for some time.

AFC Fylde
Charman left Rochdale on 14 October to sign a two-year contract with National League North club AFC Fylde, who paid an undisclosed club-record fee for his services.

Career statistics

References

External links

1997 births
Living people
Sportspeople from Durham, England
Footballers from County Durham
English footballers
Association football forwards
Newcastle United F.C. players
Accrington Stanley F.C. players
Darlington F.C. players
Rochdale A.F.C. players
AFC Fylde players
National League (English football) players
English Football League players